Ivan Sergeyevich Oblyakov (born 5 July 1998) is a Russian professional footballer who plays as a midfielder for CSKA Moscow and the Russia national team. He plays mainly as a central midfielder, but can also operate as a attacking midfielder and on the left flank.

Club career

Ufa
Born in Leningrad Oblast, Oblyakov joined Zenit Saint Petersburg aged nine. In January 2016, Oblyakov made his breakthrough performance at the Granatkin Memorial youth tournament, helping the Saint Petersburg U-18 team reach the second place. He finished the tournament with six goals and won the Best Player of the Tournament award.

On 28 June 2016, Oblyakov joined Russian Premier League club Ufa on a long-term contract. He made his debut coming as a second half substitute in a 0–2 loss to Ural in their first match of the 2016–17 Russian Premier League. On 9 April 2017, Oblyakov scored his first career goal in a 1–3 home loss to Spartak Moscow.

The following season, Oblyakov scored two goals in 20 matches, helping Ufa finish in sixth place, their highest league finish to date. On 26 July 2018, he made his debut in UEFA club competitions, starting in a goalless draw with Slovenian side Domžale in the UEFA Europa League qualifying. Two weeks later, he scored a winning goal in a 2–1 victory over Luxembourgish club Progrès Niederkorn.

CSKA Moscow
On 31 August 2018, Oblyakov signed for CSKA Moscow in the last day of the summer transfer window on a five-year deal for a reported fee of €4 million. Here, he reunited with manager Viktor Goncharenko who gave Oblyakov his senior debut while at Ufa. On the next day after joining, Oblyakov made his club debut as a 61st-minute substitute in a 4–0 win against Ural.

On 18 August 2022, Oblyakov extended his contract with CSKA to 2027.

International career
On 23 May 2019, Oblyakov was first called up to the Russia national team for UEFA Euro 2020 qualifying matches against San Marino and Cyprus in June. A year and a half later, he made his debut for senior team in a friendly match against Moldova on 12 November 2020. On 18 November 2020, Oblyakov made his competitive debut coming as a half time substitute for Anton Miranchuk in a 0–5 loss to Serbia in the UEFA Nations League.

Career statistics

Club

International

References

External links
 

1998 births
Living people
People from Volkhovsky District
Russian footballers
Russia youth international footballers
Russia under-21 international footballers
Russia international footballers
Association football midfielders
FC Ufa players
PFC CSKA Moscow players
Russian Premier League players
Sportspeople from Leningrad Oblast